Trichofrons is a monotypic moth genus of the family Adelidae, the fairy longhorn moths. The genus was erected by Amsel in 1937. Its sole species is Trichofrons pantherella, which was first described by Achille Guenée in 1849. It is found in Algeria.

References

Moths described in 1849
Adelidae
Endemic fauna of Algeria
Lepidoptera of North Africa
Moths of Africa
Monotypic moth genera
Adeloidea genera